Lucas Osiander the Elder (15 December 1534, in Nuremberg – 17 September 1604, in Stuttgart) was a German pastor of the Evangelical-Lutheran Church in Württemberg and a composer of Lutheran church music. He was a son of the reformer Andreas Osiander and father to Lucas Osiander the Younger.

Life 
Encouraged to study at an early age by his parents, the young Osiander went to school in Nuremberg and then went on to study at the University of Königsberg in East Prussia. In 1555 he became a deacon in Göppingen, in 1558 he became a pastor and superintendent in Blaubeuren, and in 1563 Pastor of the  Leonhardskirche in Stuttgart.

At this time a shift in church polity was under way, and in 1569 Osiander was appointed royal court chaplain to the Duchy of Württemberg and made a member of the Church Consistory. In the same year, he was credited as a co-editor of Sigmund Hemmel's Psalter. He was involved in the preparation of the Lutheran Formula of Concord and, together with Jakob Heerbrand, published the first Latin translation. In 1583 he was awarded a doctorate in Theology at the University of Tübingen. He became Abbot (Superintendent) and Prelate at Adelberg Abbey in 1596. Dismissed from this position in 1598, Osiander worked briefly as a preacher in Esslingen am Neckar, but returned to Adelberg after one year.

Equally well-versed in theology and music, Lucas Osiander initiated the first Württemberg hymnal of 1583 and set to music the main body of Reformation hymnody as a Cantional (collection of songs)  in 1586 to give the lay community the opportunity to join in figural music (a type of polyphonic singing). The text of the Lutheran hymn, Gott Vater, Herr, wir danken dir (Evangelisches Gesangbuch, Württemberg Regional Edition, Nr. 557) probably originated from Osiander.

Lucas Osiander's Bible commentary was incorporated into the so-called Osiander Bible, a plain-text Bible based on Martin Luther's translation, which was published by the Stern Press in Lüneburg from 1650.

Bibliography

External links 
 
 
 Digitised works of Lucas Osiander in the Post-Reformation Digital Library
 Short biography of Osiander in the Controversia et Confessio research project of the Academy of Science and Literature, Mainz
 Osianderbibel in the Niedersächsischen Landesbibliothek
Dgitial Edition and PDF from the der University and Landesbibliothek Sachsen-Anhalt

German Protestant clergy
Lucas
Clergy from Nuremberg
1534 births
1604 deaths
Classical composers of church music
German classical composers
German male classical composers
German Lutherans
German performers of Christian music
Renaissance composers
University of Königsberg alumni
16th-century German people
16th-century classical composers
German Protestant hymnwriters
16th-century German composers